Lavanya Tripathi (born 15 December 1990) is an Indian actress who predominantly works in Telugu films along with Tamil films. Tripathi made her acting debut with the Hindi television show Pyaar Ka Bandhan (2009) and made her film debut with Andala Rakshasi (2012), for which she won CineMAA Awards Best Female Debut.

Tripathi started her career as a model and won Femina Miss Uttarakhand in 2006. Post her film debut, she had initial success with Doosukeltha (2013) and Bramman (2014). Tripathi received praises for portraying a dance teacher in Bhale Bhale Magadivoy (2015) and a lonely wife in Soggade Chinni Nayana (2016). For the former, she won Zee Apsara Rising Star of the Year Award and for the latter she received Filmfare Award for Best Actress – Telugu nomination. Her other notable films include Srirastu Subhamastu (2016), for which she received SIIMA Award for Best Actress – Telugu nomination, Vunnadhi Okate Zindagi (2017), Arjun Suravaram (2019) and A1 Express (2021).

She is a recipient of several awards along with two SIIMA Awards and one Filmfare Awards South nominations. She made her web debut with the Telugu series, Puli Meka (2023).

Early life and background
Tripathi was born 15 December 1990, in Faizabad, Uttar Pradesh and she grew up in Dehradun, Uttarakhand.  Her father is a lawyer practicing in High Court and Civil Court and her mother is a retired teacher. She has two elder siblings, one brother and sister. After completing her schooling from Marshall School, Dehradun, she moved to Mumbai, where she graduated in economics from Rishi Dayaram National College.

She stated that she "always wanted to be in showbiz" but her father wanted her to complete her education first. She then started modelling, appearing in commercials, while also being part of television shows. She won the title of Miss Uttarakhand in 2006 when still in school. Tripathi's background in classical dancing, Bharatnatyam came in handy for her role in the film Bhale Bhale Magadivoy.

Career

Film debut and breakthrough (2012-2015)

Tripathi made her feature film debut with the 2012 Telugu film Andala Rakshasi, after a friend suggested her to attend the audition for the role. She earned critical acclaim for her performance as Midhuna and won the Best Debutante Award at CineMAA Awards. The following year, she starred as a doctor in Doosukeltha, opposite Vishnu Manchu which became a box office success.

In 2014, she made her debut in Tamil cinema with Bramman in which she played an aspiring journalist, Gayathri.
 The same year she played the cameo role of Radha Mohan's friend in Manam, also appeared alongside Naga Chaitanya in the film's song 'Kanulanu Thaake'.

Tripathi's breakthrough came with her portrayal of Nandana, a Kuchipudi dance teacher in Bhale Bhale Magadivoy opposite Nani. Times of India wrote, "Lavanya as the smitten lover and the loving daughter is a treat to watch. It's not just her looks but her grace and simplicity that are her assets." Deccan Chronicle said, "Lavanya Tripathi looks beautiful as Nandana and ticks all the boxes. Her chemistry with Nani is good on screen and she is one of the bright talents to look out for in future." She won Zee Telugu Apsara Awards, Rising Star of the Year for her performance.

Rise to prominence (2016-2019)
Tripathi had a successful year in 2016 with three releases. She first portrayed a lonely wife, Seeta in Soggade Chinni Nayana opposite Nagarjun. Times of India compared her to Soundarya and said "Lavanya Tripathi reminds you of Soundarya who wasn't just a beauty but a bundle of talent. Deccan Chronicle wrote, "Tripathi is very decent and had given a good performance. Though she is just a few movies old, she carried the role like an actress with a lot of experience." It was a critical and commercial success, she received Filmfare Award for Best Actress – Telugu nomination for her performance.

She next portrayed a cashier Devi in Lacchimdeviki O Lekkundi alongside Naveen Chandra. It received mixed reviews from the critics, but was a commercial success. Her final release of the year came with Srirastu Subhamastu, where she portrayed Ananya opposite Allu Sirish. It received mostly positive reviews.

Tripathi had 5 releases in 2017. She first appeared in Mister as Chandramukhi opposite Varun Tej. It receivex mixed to negative reviews from critics. Her next release cane with Radha, opposite Sharwanand, she portrayed a student Radha. It received mixed reviews. Her next release was the average grosser Yuddham Sharanam, where she was seen as Anjali, a medical intern opposite Chaitanya. Times of India wrote, "Lavanya Tripathi as Anjali, looks fresh and cute on screen. But her role is restricted to just that."

 
Tripathi next portrayed Meghana, a carefree girl and a wedding planner in Vunnadhi Okate Zindagi opposite Ram Pothineni. The Hindu praised the actress and said, "Tripathi's character is a light-hearted one and the actor pulls it off well. It’s a relief not to see Lavanya in those flowy lehengas she had become synonymous with." Times of India said she played her part well. She made her Tamil film comeback after 3 years with her final release of the year, Maayavan, where she portrayed Aadhirai, a psychiatrist. The film received positive reviews from critics but was a box-office average.

In 2018, she played Shreya in Inttelligent opposite Sai Dharam Tej. Following negative critical reception, the film became a commercial failure. Tripathi next portrayed Parvathi, a school teacher opposite Tej in Antariksham 9000 KMPH, her final release of the year. Times of India said, "Lavanya Tripathi and others deliver convincing performances, breathing life into their characters, even when they are at their unreasonable best."

Tripathi had only one release in 2019, Arjun Suravaram, where she portrayed Kavya, an aspiring journalist opposite Nikhil Siddharth. The Hindu said, she had a comparatively limited in scope but she does it efficiently. Deccan Chronicle said that she portrayed her character well.

Recent work and career expansion (2020-present)
Tripathi had two releases in 2021. Her first release was A1 Express opposite Sundeep Kishan, where she portrayed Lavanya Rao, a hockey player. Times of India wrote "Sundeep, Lavanya and the rest of the cast breathe life into their characters. There is not a single actor who seems out of place in this well-told tale." It also mentioned that, despite having potential, her character does end up being relegated to a bystander by the end of the film. She next appeared alongside Kartikeya Gummakonda in Chaavu Kaburu Challaga where she portrayed Mallika, a widow. Times of India wrote, "Lavanya Tripathi is tuned a shade darker for the role and while her makeup looks inconsistent and patchy, she delivers and makes one empathise with her character."

In 2022, she portrayed dual characters of Happy and Baby in Happy Birthday. Times of India praised her performance and said, "Lavanya Tripathi seems to have a ball, especially when the interval twist rolls around and her backstory unfolds in the latter half. It’s rare for a heroine working in TFI to get a role like this and she makes the most of it.

Tipathi will mark her Tamil film return after 6 years with Thanal, opposite Atharvaa.

Other ventures

Television
Tripathi started her acting career with Hindi television, appearing in various episodes of Ssshhhh...Koi Hai from 2006 to 2009. She next appeared as a contestant on Get Gorgeous 5 in 2008 and stood at 9th place. 

Tripathi made her fiction debut with Sony TV's Pyaar Ka Bandhan. She portrayed Mishti Das / Araina Rai from 2009 to 2010. Her last appearance on television was in 2010 where she portrayed Sakshi, in an episode of CID.

Tripathi will make her web debut with ZEE5's series Puli Meka opposite Aadi. She portrays a police officer. 123telugu noted, "Tripathi performed with aplomb. She is convincing as a cop, her stunt sequences are amazing. It is undoubtedly Lavanya’s best role to date."

Off-screen work

Tripathi has worked for a number of causes. She took up the role of "Shiksha Superheroe" for P&G Shiksha in Hyderabad. In 2020, Tripathi became the first Tollywood actress to donate for Government's Corona Crisis Charity, during COVID-19. She stated that she felt "a sense of responsibility" and came forward to contribute to the country. 

Tripathi collaborated with designer Anitha Reddy to produce washable, reusable masks for their collaborative initiative "Redtri". It also promoted Vocal for Local. She has also decided to start a nature cafe in Mussoorie.

Tripathi has ramp walked at events and has been the cover model for magazines covers including Provoke Magazine and You and I's June edition. She is also known for her minimalistic and elegant fashion sense.

Tripathi landed in controversy post her outspoken tweet slamming Brahmin pride. She tweeted, "As a Brahmin, I don't understand this whole superiority feeling among some of the Brahmins. You become superior or inferior because of what you do, not because of your caste." She later deleted the tweet and said, "Deleted bcz i didnt want to hurt anybody’s feelings while putting my point forward, as tweets can be misleading sometimes.. but i do believe in good acts than caste."

Artistry and public image

Tripathi made a promising debut with Andala Rakshasi. Times of India noted, "Lavanya has a author backed role and does a great job of it. She has a very versatile face and the filmmaker utilized it to the hilt." She gained further praises with Bhale Bhale Magadivoy and Soggade Chinni Nayana. Suresh
Kavirayani of Deccan Chronicle stated her as "one of the bright talents to look out for in future". Pranitha Jonnalagedda compared her to actress Soundarya. NDTVs Rinku Gupta has termed her as a "pretty and charming" actress.

In a 2021 Interview with 123telugu, Tripathi termed Chaavu Kaburu Challaga as the "best script" of her career. On her acting approach, she said, 

Chiranjeevi praised her line of work in a 2019 event and said, "Lavanya Tripathi is a nice and cute girl. She looked very beautiful in Bhale Bhale Magadivoy. I was shocked after watching her on the screen. I just saw her for a while without winking. She has done a good job in Arjun Suravaram as well. Lavanya has a bright future as she is well established in the South Indian film industry." Allu Arjun had even termed her a "lucky mascot".

Tripathi worked in an advertisement along with the Traffic Police Department of Telangana in 2018, for which she did not take any remuneration. She is an endorser for several brands and products, including, Fair & Lovely and Binani Cement. She has also endrosed Tripura Herbal hair oil and Gold Winner oil. She collaborated with Amazon for their "Amazon Festive Stylebook" Episode 5 in 2021. Tripathi showed 4 different elegant festive looks for women along with style tips.

Filmography

Films

Television

Music videos

Accolades

See also 
 List of Indian film actresses

References

External links
 
 

Living people
Female models from Uttarakhand
Actresses in Telugu cinema
Actresses in Hindi television
Actresses in Tamil cinema
Actresses from Dehradun
Indian film actresses
21st-century Indian actresses
People from Ayodhya
1990 births